On the Greek Side of My Mind (also known as Fire and Ice) is a debut solo album by Greek singer Demis Roussos, released in 1971 on Philips Records.

Commercial performance 
The album entered the top 10 in Denmark (according to I.F.P.I. data).

Track listings 
Arranged by Demis Roussos. String arrangements by Lakis Vlavianos. Produced by J.-C. Desmarty.

Fire and Ice (Philips 6325 129)

On the Greek Side of My Mind (Philips 63332 012)

Certifications

References

External links 
 Demis Roussos – Fire and Ice (1971) at Discogs
 Demis Roussos – On the Greek Side of My Mind (1971) at Discogs

1971 albums
Demis Roussos albums
Philips Records albums